Mauricio Vieyto Acosta (born 5 December 1996 in Montevideo) is a Uruguayan volleyball player.

Results
 Pan American Games
 2015 Toronto: 5th (with Renzo Cairus)

 Summer Youth Olympics
 2014 Nanjing: 5th (with Marco Cairus)

Clubs
  Club Social y Deportivo Juan Ferreira (2019-2020)
  Athlitiki Enosi Neon Paralimniou (2020-  )

References

External links
 
 
 

1996 births
Living people
Uruguayan beach volleyball players
Men's beach volleyball players
Beach volleyball players at the 2015 Pan American Games
Pan American Games competitors for Uruguay
Beach volleyball players at the 2014 Summer Youth Olympics
Beach volleyball players at the 2019 Pan American Games